J.Carter Sporting Club Limited (operating as Castore) is a British manufacturer of sportswear and athletic clothing, headquartered in Manchester, England. The company's products are sold in more than 50 countries worldwide and have sponsorship deals with association football teams, cricket teams, rugby union teams, Formula One teams, and tennis players.

History
The company was founded in 2015 by brothers Thomas (born September 1989) and Philip Beahon (born November 1992) when they were 25 and 22 years old respectively. Tom had been a professional youth football player for Tranmere Rovers between the ages of 17 and 21 before spending time at Jerez Industrial in Spain and attending the Glenn Hoddle Academy. Phil played semi-professional cricket for Cheshire and Lancashire cricket clubs.

The pair left their playing careers in 2013 and moved to London to work in finance in an effort to raise money for their sportswear venture; Tom worked at Lloyds Bank and Phil for Deloitte. During their time in London they began their market research by interviewing patrons of high-end gymnasiums and signing up a number of prolific investors from the fashion and sporting industries. Castore launched online in 2016. In 2019 Forbes listed the pair in their "30 Under 30" list.

Sponsorships

2019

In January 2019, Castore became the official kit partner to British tennis champion Andy Murray, who also became a shareholder in the company in March of that year. The company brands Murray's products as AMC, and it became the official apparel partner of the Lawn Tennis Association. Marlie Packer, who plays for England's women's rugby union team, is a brand ambassador for Castore. In December 2019, Cricket West Indies signed a three-year deal with Castore to produce their official kit.

2020

In early 2020, Castore secured £7.5 million in funds from undisclosed private investors to help the company move into elite professional football. In May 2020, Castore became the official kit supplier of Scottish Premiership club, Rangers on a five-year deal believed to be worth £25 million.

2021

In May 2021, McLaren and Castore announced a multi-year deal for them to become the official team apparel and sportswear partner to the McLaren Formula One team. In the same month, Castore signed a multi-year deal with Premier League club Wolverhampton Wanderers to become their new on-field partner. This partnership deviated from previous agreements held by the company, with Castore providing the playing staff with kits, while Wolves manufactured and distributed the replica kits under license.

In June 2021, it was announced that rugby union side Saracens had agreed a five-year supply deal with Castore ahead of their return to Premiership Rugby in the 2021–22 season. The deal also included additional partnerships with Saracens' women's team and Saracens Mavericks netball team. In July 2021, Castore signed a multi-year deal with Premier League club Newcastle United to become their new kit manufacturer.

In September 2021, it was announced that the England and Wales Cricket Board had signed a ten-year deal with Castore worth £25 million to become the official kit supplier, starting from April 2022. The same month Cricket South Africa signed a three-year deal with Castore to produce their official kit, and in December Kent County Cricket Club announced it would partner with Castore as a technical partner beginning in the 2022 season.

2022

Ahead of the 2022–23 season, Castore continued its expansion into professional football, announcing new partnerships with Premier League club Aston Villa, English Football League clubs Charlton Athletic, Milton Keynes Dons and Salford City, as well as La Liga club Sevilla, Bundesliga club Bayer Leverkusen and Serie B club Genoa.

2023

Ahead of the 2023 Formula One season, Red Bull Racing announced that they would be leaving Puma for Castore for the 2023 Formula One season.

Also from the 2023–24 football season in the Netherlands, Feyenoord announced that they will leave Adidas after 9 years for Castore.

And also starting the 2023 MotoGP season, Repsol Honda Team announced that will leave Alpinestars for Castore as the new official team apparel.

Football

National teams

Club teams

  Union Saint-Gilloise (from the 2023-24 season)
  Aston Villa 
  Charlton Athletic 
  Milton Keynes Dons 
  Newcastle United (until the 2023-24 season)
  Preston North End (from the 2023-24 season)
  Salford City 
  Wolverhampton Wanderers
  Bayer Leverkusen 
  Genoa
  Feyenoord (from the 2023–24 season)
  Sevilla 
  Almería 
  Athletic Club (from the 2023–24 season)
  Rangers

Cricket
National teams

 England
 South Africa
 West Indies

County teams

 Kent

Cycling
  Team Bahrain Victorious
  INEOS Grenadiers (from 2023 season)

Golf
  Matt Fitzpatrick

Motor Racing 
Formula One
  McLaren
  Red Bull Racing (from 2023 season)

MotoGP
  Repsol Honda Team (from 2023 season)

Netball
  Saracens Mavericks

Rugby League

  Melbourne Storm
  Sydney Roosters

Rugby Union
National teams

  
 

Club teams

 Saracens
 Scarlets  (from the 2022-2023 season)
 Harlequins  (from the 2022-2023 season)

Swimming
  Adam Peaty

Taekwondo
  GB Taekwondo

Tennis

Events 
  Lawn Tennis Association

Players 
  Andy Murray
  Lloyd Glasspool

Ownership
, the company has 33 shareholders with the largest being the two founders, each with 18.59%, and Monte Group (Jersey) LTD with 15%. Other shareholders of the company include Robert Senior (former CEO of Saatchi & Saatchi), Tom Singh (founder of New Look), YOOX Net-a-Porter Group investor Arnaud Massenet, and tennis player Andy Murray.

Footnotes

References

External links
 
 J.Carter Sporting Club Ltd at Companies House

2010s fashion
2020s fashion
British companies established in 2015
Clothing brands of the United Kingdom
Clothing companies established in 2015
Companies based in Manchester
Sporting goods manufacturers of the United Kingdom
Sportswear brands